Daniel Spencer Reid (born July 25, 1944) is a Canadian physician and politician. He represented the electoral district of Pictou West in the Nova Scotia House of Assembly from 1974 to 1978. He was a member of the Nova Scotia Liberal Party.

Reid was born in Middle Musquodoboit, Nova Scotia. He attended Dalhousie University, where he earned his Doctor of Medicine (M.D.) degree. In 1973, he married Anne Marie MacDonald. He served in the Executive Council of Nova Scotia as Minister of Fisheries.

References

1944 births
Living people
Nova Scotia Liberal Party MLAs
Dalhousie University alumni
Members of the Executive Council of Nova Scotia